Brent Haygarth (born 27 December 1967) is a former professional tennis player from South Africa. He enjoyed most of his tennis success while playing doubles. During his career, he won six doubles titles and finished runner-up an additional six times. He achieved a career-high doubles ranking of world No. 40 in 1999. He is the son of tennis player Renée Schuurman.

Career finals

Doubles (6 wins, 6 losses)

External links
 
 

South African male tennis players
Living people
1967 births
White South African people
Sportspeople from Durban